Flavius Pogăcean (born 6 October 1974) is a retired Romanian football midfielder.

References

1974 births
Living people
Romanian footballers
FC Inter Sibiu players
FC Progresul București players
ACF Gloria Bistrița players
CS Gaz Metan Mediaș players
Association football midfielders